Mahmoud Attiyah (Arabic:محمود عطية) (born 1 April 1989) is a Qatari footballer.

References

External links
 

Qatari footballers
1989 births
Living people
Al-Sailiya SC players
Al-Shahania SC players
Al-Wakrah SC players
Al-Markhiya SC players
Qatar Stars League players
Qatari Second Division players
Association football wingers